Camponotus mendax is a species of carpenter ant (genus Camponotus). It is found from India, and Sri Lanka, where the two subspecies are geographically separated.

Subspecies
Camponotus mendax integer Forel, 1895 - Sri Lanka
Camponotus mendax mendax Forel, 1895 - India

References

External links

 at antwiki.org
Itis.gov
Animaldiversity.org

mendax
Hymenoptera of Asia
Insects described in 1782